Sar Cheshmeh (also Romanized as Sar Chashmeh) is a village in Howmeh Rural District, in the Central District of Shirvan County, North Khorasan Province, Iran. At the 2006 census, its population was 364, in 100 families.

References 

Populated places in Shirvan County